Biagio Pagano (born 29 January 1983) is an Italian footballer who plays for Ghivizzano Borgoamozzano.

Pagano had made 250 appearances in Italian Serie B, including 2 in the playoffs in 2008–09 Serie B.

Career

Atalanta
Pagano started his career at Atalanta. He made his Serie A debut on 17 June 2001 against Juventus F.C. He played a few more Serie A games for Atalanta in October 2003, after he was returned from loan to Lumezzane of the third division in 2002–03 Serie C1.

Sampdoria
In January 2004, he was signed by fellow Serie A club U.C. Sampdoria on loan with option to co-own the player, which the club did in June 2004, for €500,000. He scored his first Serie A goal against A.S. Roma, which gave the team a 1–0 lead, but the game ended in 1–1 draw after Francesco Totti scored a penalty 3 minutes later, in 2004–05 Serie A. He was loaned back to Atalanta in January 2005. Atalanta were relegated at the end of the season, so Pagano went on loan to Bari instead of staying with the Nerazzurri.

Rimini
In June 2006, Sampdoria bought Atalanta's rights in a blind auction between the two clubs, for €205,000. But he was sold to Rimini in a co-ownership deal in July 2006 for €400,000. With Rimini, Pagano played regularly and finished 5th and 7th with the team in his first 2 seasons; his performance also made the club bought him outright in the end of the first season in June 2007 for €220,000. But in the third season, Rimini failed to win the relegation playoffs against A.C. Ancona, and subsequently got relegated back to Lega Pro 1st Div. (ex–Serie C1) after being promoted 4 years ago. Pagano took part in the playoffs.

Reggina
In July 2009, he was signed by Reggina of Serie B, who had recently been relegated from Serie A, in a co-ownership deal. In June 2010 Reggina acquired the remain 50% registration rights from Rimini .

Livorno
In July 2010 Pagano was signed by A.S. Livorno Calcio.

Torino
In January 2011 Pagano was swapped with Luca Belingheri of Torino F.C.; both players were tagged for €300,000. Pagano signed a -year contract.

Modena
In August 2012 Pagano was signed by Serie B club Modena F.C. for free.

Lega Pro clubs
In 2014, he was signed by third level club U.S. Grosseto F.C. He spent the first half of the season in Eccellenza Tuscany club Ponsacco. On 5 July 2014 Pagano was signed by Catanzaro. On 22 January 2015 he joined Lucchese.

International
Pagano took part in 2000 UEFA European Under-16 Football Championship qualifying. (now renamed to under-17 with same age limit) He was also capped for Italy U17 (equivalent to current U18), U20 and Italy U21 team.

References

External links
 aic.football.it  
 
 gazzetta.it
 
 FIGC National Team Archive  
 

Italian footballers
Atalanta B.C. players
U.C. Sampdoria players
S.S.C. Bari players
Rimini F.C. 1912 players
Reggina 1914 players
A.S.G. Nocerina players
Torino F.C. players
Modena F.C. players
U.S. Catanzaro 1929 players
F.C. Ponsacco 1920 S.S.D. players
F.C. Grosseto S.S.D. players
S.S.D. Lucchese 1905 players
Serie A players
Serie B players
Serie C players
Serie D players
Italy under-21 international footballers
Italy youth international footballers
Association football midfielders
Footballers from Naples
1983 births
Living people